Phillip Louis Mathews (born November 27, 1950) is an American basketball coach who is currently head men's basketball coach at Riverside City College. A native of Riverside, California, Mathews played college basketball at Riverside City and UC Irvine.

Since 1972, Mathews has coached at the high school, junior college, and college levels. He began his career as an assistant at UC Irvine, Santa Ana Valley High School, and Cal State Fullerton. From 1985 to 1995, Mathews was a junior college head coach at Ventura and led Ventura to ten conference titles and two state titles. Mathews then was head coach for the University of San Francisco from 1995 to 2004, before returning to the junior college ranks as San Bernardino Valley head coach from 2004 to 2006. Mathews then became an assistant coach at two NCAA programs, Nebraska from 2006 to 2010 and UCLA from 2010 to 2013. Mathews became head coach at Riverside City in 2013.

In the 1998 episode of Teletubbies entitled, "Basketball", Mathews made an appearance with his son, Jordan, as they played basketball on the Sobrato Center court.

Early life and college playing career
Phillip Louis Mathews was born in Riverside, California and graduated from John W. North High School in Riverside in 1968. Mathews then attended Riverside City College for two years and transferred to the University of California, Irvine and  lettered two years as a guard on the UC Irvine Anteaters men's basketball team. Mathews graduated from UC Irvine in 1972 with a B.A. in comparative cultures.

Coaching career
Mathews began his coaching career in the 1972–73 season as an assistant at UC Irvine under Tim Tift. He then spent one season as junior varsity coach at Santa Ana Valley High School before returning to UC Irvine for four more seasons as an assistant again under Tift. UC Irvine, then in Division II, made the 1974 NCAA tournament. In 1978, Mathews returned to Santa Ana Valley High to become varsity basketball coach. In three seasons with Mathews as coach, Santa Ana Valley won two Century League titles.

In 1981, Mathews returned to the collegiate ranks in his first NCAA Division I job, as an assistant coach at Cal State Fullerton under George McQuarn. During Mathews's four seasons on staff, Cal State Fullerton made the 1983 National Invitation Tournament.

From 1985 to 1995, Mathews was head coach on the junior college level, at Ventura College. Mathews had a 298–56 record at Ventura, with CCCAA titles in 1987 and 1995. Mathews also served as athletics coordinator at Ventura in the 1994–95 season.

Mathews then was head coach at the University of San Francisco from 1995 to 2004. San Francisco had winning records in 6 of Mathews's nine seasons (including every season from 1995–96 to 1999–00) and made the 1998 NCAA tournament by virtue of winning the WCC tournament. After the 2003–04 season, USF fired Mathews, who finished his tenure with a 139–123 record.

After USF, Mathews returned to the junior college ranks as head coach at San Bernardino Valley College. Mathews led San Bernardino Valley to a 27–5 record in 2004–05 with the Foothill Conference title, then 24–12 in 2005–06. In 2006, Mathews returned to Division I as an assistant coach at Nebraska under Doc Sadler. Mathews remained on staff for four seasons, during which Nebraska made the NIT in 2008 and  2009.

In 2010, Mathews joined Ben Howland's staff at UCLA as an assistant coach. Mathews coached for three seasons, during which UCLA made the NCAA Tournament in 2011 and 2013 and won the Pac-12 regular season title in 2013. Mathews became head coach at Riverside City College in 2013. Riverside went 12–17 in 2013–14, then 10–17 in 2014–15.

Personal life
Mathews's two sons Jordan and Jonah are professional basketball players.

Head coaching record

Junior college

College

References

1950 births
Living people
American men's basketball players
Basketball coaches from California
Basketball players from California
Cal State Fullerton Titans men's basketball coaches
College men's basketball head coaches in the United States
High school basketball coaches in the United States
Nebraska Cornhuskers men's basketball coaches
Riverside City Tigers men's basketball coaches
Riverside City Tigers men's basketball players
San Francisco Dons men's basketball coaches
UC Irvine Anteaters men's basketball coaches
UC Irvine Anteaters men's basketball players
UCLA Bruins men's basketball coaches
Ventura Pirates men's basketball coaches
Guards (basketball)